The 2008 National Premier Soccer League season was the 6th season of the NPSL. The season started in May, 2008, and ended with the NPSL Championship Game on August 3, 2008.

Pennsylvania Stoners finished the season as national champions, beating St. Paul Twin Stars in the NPSL Championship game in Uniondale, New York on 3 August 2008.

Pennsylvania Stoners forward Tom Ehrlich was named the National Premier Soccer League's Player of the Year. Tom Ehrlich was also the league's top scorer, with 11 goals.

Changes From 2007

New Franchises
Twelve franchises joined the league this year, all expansion franchises:

Name Changes
Rockford Raptors changed its name to Chicago Fire NPSL (the actual organization did not change its name, just its NPSL competitive arm)
Maryland United changed its name to Charm City FC mid-season

Folding
Six teams left the league prior to the beginning of the season:
Colorado Crimson - Broomfield, Colorado
Denver Kickers - Golden, Colorado
Indianapolis Braves - Lawrence, Indiana
Real Shore FC - Lincroft, New Jersey
San Diego Pumitas - San Diego, California
Southern California Fusion - Carlsbad, California
In addition, three 2007 teams chose to spend the 2008 season on hiatus, with plans to return in 2009:
FC Indiana - Indianapolis, Indiana
Indios USA - Canutillo, Texas
Sacramento Knights - Sacramento, California

Final standings
Purple indicates division title clinched

North Division

Mid-Atlantic Division

Southeast Division

Midwest Division

Southwest Division

Northwest Division

Playoffs

Divisional Rounds
Sonoma County Sol 3-1 San Diego United
Minnesota TwinStars beat Atlanta FC

Semi finals
Pennsylvania Stoners beat Sonoma County SolMinnesota TwinStars 1-1 Long Island Academy (Minnesota TwinStars win 4-2 on penalties)

Final
Pennsylvania Stoners 3-0 St. Paul Twin Stars

Bracket

References
 US soccer history archives for 2008

National Premier Soccer League seasons
4